Songs of Kabir is a 1915 book consisting of 100 poems of Kabir, the 15th-century Indian poet and mystic, translated from Hindi to English by Rabindranath Tagore. In this book Kabir has combined the philosophies of Sufism and Hinduism. The book had an introduction by Evelyn Underhill and was published by Macmillan, New York. This book has been translated to Persian and Kurdish by Leila Farjami and Sayed Madeh Piryonesi, respectively.

Authenticity
Scholars believe only six of its hundred poems are authentic, and they have questioned whether Tagore introduced then prevalent theological perspectives onto Kabir, as he translated poems in early 20th century that he presumed to be of Kabir's. The unauthentic poems nevertheless belong to the Bhakti movement in medieval India, and may have been composed by admirers of Kabir who lived later.

References

Sources

External links

 
Gutenberg: Songs of Kabir by Rabindranath Tagore

1915 poetry books
Works by Rabindranath Tagore
Translations into English
English-language books
Macmillan Publishers books
Indian poetry collections
Bhakti movement